The crown cork (also known as a crown seal, crown cap or just a cap), the first form of bottle cap, was invented by William Painter in 1892 in Baltimore. The company making it was originally called the Bottle Seal Company, but it changed its name with the almost immediate success of the crown cork to the Crown Cork and Seal Company. It still informally goes by that name, but is officially Crown Holdings.

Overview

The crown cork was the first highly successful disposable product (it can be resealed, but not easily). This inspired King C. Gillette to invent the disposable razor when he was a salesman for the Crown Cork Company. The firm still survives, producing many forms of packaging.

Prior to the invention of the crown cork bottle stopper, soda bottles had ordinary cork bottle stoppers and often had rounded bottoms so they could not be stored standing upright. The reason for this is corks have a tendency to dry out and shrink, which allows the gas pressure in the bottle to cause the cork to "pop". Storing bottles on their side prevents the corks from drying out and "popping". After the invention of the crown cork bottle stopper, this problem was eliminated, and soda bottles could be stored standing upright.

Crown corks are collected by people around the world who admire the variety of designs and relative ease of storage. Collectors tend to prefer the term "crown cap" over "cork".

See also
Bottle opener
Flip-top

References

External links

 Live Counter of produced crown corks
 
 
 The Crowncap Collectors Society International
 Bottle Cap Index
 Davide's Crown Caps Homepage
 Collection of Alex and Gemma 

American inventions
Food packaging
Bottles

sv:Kapsyl#Kapsyltyper